Alfons Dobler (9 October 1947 – 1 October 2008) is an Austrian football manager.

References

1947 births
2008 deaths
Austrian football managers
FC Vaduz managers
USV Eschen/Mauren managers
Austrian expatriate football managers